Antonio Margarito Montiel (born March 18, 1978) is a Mexican-American former professional boxer who competed between 1994 and 2017. He held multiple welterweight world championships, including the WBO title from 2002 to 2007, the IBF title in 2008, and the WBA (Super) title from 2008 to 2009. He also challenged three times for a light middleweight world title between 2004 and 2011. Nicknamed El Tornado de Tijuana ("The Tijuana Tornado"), Margarito was known for his aggressive pressure fighting style and exceptionally durable chin.

In 2009, just before his fight with Shane Mosley, Margarito was involved in an incident where he was caught with illegal hand wraps containing gypsum (calcium sulfate) which, when combined with moisture, forms plaster of Paris. His signature stoppage victory over Miguel Cotto in 2008 was subsequently called into question. Following consecutive losses to Manny Pacquiao (a fight in which Margarito sustained career-changing eye damage) and a rematch against Cotto, Margarito retired from boxing in 2012 but returned for three more fights between 2016 and 2017.

Early life and amateur career
	
Margarito was born in Torrance, California. From the age of two, he grew up in Tijuana, Mexico, where he and his brother spent a lot of time in a neighborhood boxing gym.

He compiled a record of 18–3 in his relatively brief amateur career, indicating that he may have turned pro quickly due to financial concerns (which he himself confirmed on his personal television segment on HBO: Ring Life: Antonio Margarito).

Professional career

Welterweight
Margarito made his debut at the age of 15, beating Jose Trujillo in Tijuana by decision. On April 25 he achieved his first knockout, defeating Victor Angulo in the second round. On October 17 he suffered his first defeat, a six-round decision to Victor Lozoya. Over the next six bouts, he went 4–2. Following that, his financial situation dramatically improved (which is what he was trying to achieve early on in his career) and from there he went 28–2–1, with notable wins over Alfred Ankamah, Juan Soberanes, future World Middleweight Champion Sergio Martínez, Buck Smith, David Kamau and Frankie Randall, a former World Light Welterweight Champion who became the first man to beat Julio César Chávez in 91 fights.

First world title fight
On July 21, 2001, he got his first world title try against southpaw Daniel Santos for the WBO Welterweight title at Bayamón, Puerto Rico's Rubén Rodríguez Coliseum. The fight had to be stopped in the first round as a consequence of a clash of heads that opened deep gashes on both fighters and sent them both to a nearby hospital. Because the fight had not gone at least four rounds, a technical decision could not be awarded. The bout was declared a no contest and Santos retained the belt.

WBO welterweight champion
Santos then vacated the WBO title to go up in weight and pursue the WBO Light Middleweight Championship and Margarito was assigned to fight Antonio Díaz for the vacant title in front of an HBO Boxing audience. On March 16, 2002, Margarito crowned himself world champion, beating Diaz by knockout in round ten. He defended that crown with a decision in twelve over Danny Perez Ramírez and a knockout in two over former WBA title holder Andrew Lewis. Lewis was a southpaw and a hard puncher, but had been exposed as having a weak chin, while Margarito proved that he has a world class chin. He publicly asked for a unification bout with then WBC and WBA Champion Ricardo Mayorga.

At this point, Margarito considered going up in weight to try to lure Fernando Vargas, Oscar De La Hoya or Shane Mosley into a lucrative fight, or Santos into a rematch at the light middleweight division. On October 17, 2003, Margarito made his light middleweight division debut with a two-round knockout win over Maurice Brantley in Phoenix, Arizona.

On January 31, 2004, back in the welterweight division, he retained his title with a second-round knockout of Canada's previously undefeated Hercules Kyvelos.

Margarito faced Daniel Santos in a rematch on September 11 of the same year at the José Miguel Agrelot Coliseum in San Juan for Santos' WBO Light Middleweight title. The rematch also ended because of a headbutt, but this time, as the fight had already reached the four rounds mark needed for fights like these to be decided by judges, Margarito lost by a split ten round technical decision. He was down on two scorecards when the fight was stopped.

On April 23, 2005, Margarito retained his WBO welterweight title against another Puerto Rican, undefeated world class puncher Kermit Cintron, dropping him four times on his way to a fifth-round knockout (this fight was televised by ESPN Pay-Per-View Boxing). This was regarded as one of his best wins.

After almost a ten-month layoff, Margarito returned to the boxing ring on February 18, 2006, retaining his title with a first-round knockout of Jaime Manuel Gomez, who had lasted eleven rounds with Mosley for the IBF Lightweight title eight and a half years before.

On December 2, 2006, Margarito defeated future champion Joshua Clottey by a twelve-round unanimous decision. Margarito set a Compubox all-time record of 1,675 total punches thrown in a twelve-round bout. In the aftermath of the fight, it was revealed that Margarito had injured his ankle a week before the fight, but went on to fight regardless of the injury.

Losing and regaining the WBO welterweight title

On July 14, 2007, Margarito lost a 12-round unanimous decision to undefeated challenger Paul Williams, losing his WBO belt. After the bout, Margarito heavily disputed the decision, claiming that he had landed the most meaningful punches. Williams, however, landed the most punches (outhitting Margarito by almost a 2–1 ratio and throwing an average of over 100 punches per round) according to compubox.

On April 12, 2008, Margarito engaged in a rematch with Cintron, who had won the IBF Welterweight title belt following his loss to Margarito in 2005. In the early rounds, Cintron struck Margarito with several flush power shots to the head, but Margarito remained unhurt and continued to execute a game plan of continuously moving forward and pressuring Cintron. In the sixth round, Margarito landed a liver shot, knocking Cintron out and taking the IBF title. As the referee counted Cintron out, HBO cameras captured Margarito from a neutral corner, gesturing upward with his arms and urging Cintron to get up so that the two men could continue fighting.

Margarito vs. Cotto

Following his successful rematch with Cintron, the IBF ordered him to fight a mandatory defense against the organization's number-one contender, Joshua Clottey, whom Margarito had previously defeated in 2006. Rather than agreeing to a rematch with Clottey, Margarito vacated the IBF title and agreed to a fight with undefeated WBA Welterweight Champion Miguel Cotto of Puerto Rico. The Cotto-Margarito match took place on July 26, 2008, in Las Vegas.

Margarito won in the 11th round via technical knockout. Margarito had lost almost all the early rounds, but he came back with relentless pace, eventually winning in the 11th round, in which was one of the best fights of the year. At the time of the stoppage, Margarito was ahead by two rounds on two judges' scorecards, with one judge having it even. Prior to his fight with Shane Mosley, Margarito had a record of 37 wins, 5 losses and 1 no contest, with 27 wins by knockout.

Margarito vs. Mosley
Margarito fought Shane Mosley on January 24, 2009, at the Staples Center in Los Angeles to defend his WBA title and for the vacant Lineal Welterweight Championship of Lineal Champs and Cyber Boxing Zone (CBZ). The Ring did not recognize this bout for its vacant Welterweight Championship despite the fact it pitted The Ring #1 ranked welterweight, Antonio Margarito, vs. The Ring #3 ranked welterweight, Shane Mosley. Coming in the bout, Margarito had just stopped the previous The Ring #1 ranked welterweight and current The Ring #2 ranked welterweight, Miguel Cotto. In the fight, Margarito was battered and outclassed by Mosley and lost the fight and his WBA title by 9th-round technical knockout.

After the knockout loss, Margarito said he was weight-drained during the fight, and was also suffering from dehydration and back problems.

Margarito vs. García

Margarito was scheduled to return to the ring on March 13, 2010, against Carson Jones, pending his relicensing, on the Pacquiao-Clottey undercard. But for reasons unspecified, promoter Top Rank announced he would not return.
Margarito expressed interest in fighting Filipino boxer Manny Pacquiao if the latter's bout with Floyd Mayweather Jr. did not materialize.

His comeback fight was postponed until May 8 and was held at Aguascalientes, Mexico, where he faced light middleweight contender Roberto García (28–2). Margarito won a ten-round unanimous decision over García to capture the vacant WBC International Light Middleweight title. The judges' score cards were 99–89, 100–88 and 99–90, all in favor of Margarito.

Margarito knocked García down in the first round, the first time García was knocked down in his boxing career.

Margarito vs. Pacquiao

On July 23, 2010, Bob Arum announced that Margarito would face Manny Pacquiao for the WBC Light Middleweight championship that was vacated by current Middleweight champion Sergio Martínez. The fight took place on Saturday, November 13, 2010, in Cowboys Stadium in Arlington, Texas, as Margarito got a boxing license in Texas, United States. In his camp for this fight, Margarito had four southpaw sparring partners who are; Karim Martínez, Cleotis Pendarvis, number one mandatory for the WBA Light Middleweight title, Austin Trout, and U.S. Olympic silver medalist Ricardo Williams. Five weeks before the fight, Margarito and Lightweight boxer Brandon Ríos were interviewed by Elie Seckbach and the video taken showed both of them (Margarito and Ríos) mocking Manny Pacquiao's trainer Freddie Roach who has Parkinson's disease. On the Thursday before the fight, Margarito publicly apologized to Roach and to everyone suffering from Parkinson's. Margarito had a 17-pound weight advantage (weighing 165 to Pacquiao's 148), a 5.5 inch height advantage, and a six-inch reach advantage. Margarito was dominated by Pacquiao and took a savage, brutal, relentless beating for 12 rounds, and suffered bad eye damage in this fight. On the fourth episode of HBO reality show 24/7, it was observed that one week before the fight, Margarito weighed in at 154 lbs with the fight scheduled at a catchweight of 150 lbs. The fight wound up being a unanimous decision loss for Margarito, with the judges' scorecards being 120–108, 119–109, and 118–108. Margarito was taken to the hospital directly after the fight where it was discovered that his left orbital bone had been fractured. Surgery had to be postponed to two days later as his face was too swollen to operate on.

Margarito vs. Cotto II

On December 3, 2011, Margarito was defeated by Miguel Cotto via TKO by doctor stoppage in the 10th round. The fight was stopped at the start of the 10th round because of the condition of Margarito's right eye, which was swelled shut. This was the same eye that was badly damaged in his previous fight with Manny Pacquiao and the one that almost kept the New York State Athletic Commission from granting him his boxing license because of the special procedure that was performed on it in 2010. Margarito retired following this fight.

Comeback
Margarito came out of retirement in 2016, winning two bouts that year. He faced Carson Jones on September 2, 2017, winning a slugfest by seventh-round technical decision after a cut opened up on Margarito's eye in the early rounds.

Tampered handwraps controversy
Before Margarito vs. Mosley, Mosley's trainer, Naazim Richardson, observed that Margarito had a pasty white substance in his handwraps. One doctor described this material as plaster hidden in the wrapped hands of Margarito, leading to accusations that he may have been trying to cheat. At Richardson's insistence, California State Inspector Dean Lohuis called for Margarito's hands to be rewrapped. According to Judd Burstein, the attorney for Mosley, Margarito had wet pads in the wrapping. Mosley's doctor, Robert Olvera, likened the material to the type of plaster used to make casts. Burstein said he seized the pad removed from the wrapping and another pad found in Margarito's dressing room. Both were placed in a sealed box that was given to Lohuis for further study. The California Department of Justice laboratory later confirmed the substance to be similar in nature to plaster of Paris.

In late January the California State Athletic Commission suspended Margarito and his trainer, Javier Capetillo, pending investigation. At the hearing, Margarito claimed he did not know what was in the wraps, while Capetillo admitted to making "a big mistake" by placing the wrong inserts into Margarito's hand wraps. The commission voted unanimously to revoke Margarito and Capetillo's licenses for at least one year. While it found Margarito did not know about the gloves, it took the line that as head of the team, he was responsible for Capetillo's actions. 

Since state boxing commissions generally honor suspensions imposed in other states, this action effectively banned Margarito from boxing in the United States.

In November 2009, it emerged that red stains on the hand wraps Margarito used in the Cotto fight were similar to the stains on the inserts seized before the Mosley fight. This has raised suspicions that Margarito's gloves were loaded for that fight and possibly others as well.

Personal life
Margarito resides in Los Angeles, California, with his wife Lorena, whom he married after his first marriage to his childhood sweetheart Michelle, whom he married in 1999, came to an end.

Professional boxing record

See also
Notable boxing families
List of welterweight boxing champions
List of WBA champions
List of IBF champions
List of WBO champions
List of Mexican boxing world champions

References

External links

Antonio Margarito profile at About.com

Boxers from Baja California
Sportspeople from Tijuana
International Boxing Federation champions
World Boxing Association champions
World Boxing Organization champions
Boxers from California
Light-middleweight boxers
1978 births
Living people
American male boxers
Mexican male boxers
World welterweight boxing champions
Sportspeople from Torrance, California